The 1913 Italian Athletics Championships  were held in Milan. it was the 8th edition, but first complete, of the Italian Athletics Championships.

Champions

References

External links 
 Italian Athletics Federation

Italian Athletics Championships
Italian Athletics Outdoor Championships
1913 in Italian sport